DeAndrew T. Rubin Sr. (born October 9, 1978) is a former American football wide receiver and defensive back. Rubin attended Dixie Hollins High School in Saint Petersburg, Florida and the University of South Florida and was a starting receiver after being redshirted in 1999. He places on USF's career leaderboard in receiving touchdowns.

After running a 4.31 in the 40-yard dash and showing off a 35½-inch vertical jump, Rubin was drafted by the Green Bay Packers in the seventh round of the 2003 NFL Draft.

Rubin never played in a regular season NFL game. Upon being released by the Packers in 2003, Rubin was signed and attended training camp with the Indianapolis Colts in 2004, but was waived before the regular season began. Rubin then went to the Tampa Bay Buccaneers in 2005, and was signed to their practice squad. Rubin also played in NFL Europe in 2004.

In his rookie season with the Predators, Rubin caught 46 passes for 588 yards and ten touchdowns in 2006, while also making 17.5 tackles and one sack. In his first game with the Storm, Rubin caught 5 touchdown passes and had more than 150 receiving yards.

External links
AFL stats
footballdb.com page

1978 births
Living people
American football wide receivers
South Florida Bulls football players
Green Bay Packers players
Amsterdam Admirals players
Scottish Claymores players
Orlando Predators players
New Orleans VooDoo players
Tampa Bay Storm players
Dallas Vigilantes players
Lakeland Raiders players
Players of American football from St. Petersburg, Florida